The 1992 Tokyo Indoor also known as "Seiko Super Tennis" was a men's tennis tournament played on indoor carpet courta in Tokyo, Japan that was part of the 1992 ATP Tour and was an ATP Championship Series event, today known as the ATP World Tour 500 series. It was the 15th edition of the tournament and was held from 12 October through 18 October 1992. Matches were the best of three sets. Fifth-seeded Ivan Lendl won the singles title, his fourth at the event.

Finals

Singles

 Ivan Lendl defeated  Henrik Holm 7–6(9–7), 6–4
 It was Lendl's only singles title of the year and the 92nd of his career.

Doubles

 Todd Woodbridge /  Mark Woodforde defeated  Jim Grabb /  Richey Reneberg 7–6, 6–4

References

External links
 ITF tournament edition details

Tokyo Indoor
Tokyo Indoor
Tokyo Indoor